Sarang may refer to:
Sarang Bagade : NEET Asperient

Geography 
 Kot Sarang, a village and union council of Chakwal District in the Punjab Province of Pakistan
 Kota Sarang Semut, a small town in Kedah, Malaysia
 Kotla Sarang Khan, a village located in Kharian Tehsil, Gujrat District in Punjab Province of Pakistan
 Sarang (subdistrict), a subdistrict of Rembang Regency, Central Java, Indonesia
 Sarang, Maharashtra, a village near the town of Dapoli, Ratnagiri district, Maharashtra, India
 Sarang, Odisha, Dhenkanal district, India, location of Indira Gandhi Institute of Technology, Sarang
 Sarang Abad, a village in Khairpur District, Pakistan
 Sarang Buaya, a tourist village in Semerah, Batu Pahat District, Johor, Malaysia
 Sarang Buaya River, a river in Johor, Malaysia
 Sarang Kheda Dam, an earthfill dam on Waki river near Sinnar in the state of Maharashtra in India
 Sarang-e Sofla or Sārang, a village in Kakhk Rural District, Kakhk District, Gonabad County, Razavi Khorasan Province, Iran

Organisations and groups 
 Community Radio Sarang, Mangalore, Karnataka, India
 SaRang Community Church, a Presbyterian Church in Seoul, Korea
 Sarang Community Church of Southern California, a Presbyterian Church in America (PCA) Korean-American church located in Anaheim, California
 Sarang display team, a helicopter aerobatic display team of the Indian Air Force
 Sarang school, Palakkad, Kerala, India

People 
Surname
 Rustam Sarang (born 1988), Indian weightlifter
 Vilas Sarang (1942–2015), Indian writer, critic and translator
 Vishvas Sarang (active 2013), Indian politician in Madhya Pradesh

Given name
 Sarang Gakhar (died 1546), Chief of the Gakhar tribe in the Pothohar region in northern Punjab region, in modern-day Pakistan
 Sarang Rawat (born 1995), Indian cricketer
 Sa-rang (Korean given name), a feminine Korean given name

Music 
 Brindavani Sarang, a Hindustani classical raga
 Sarang ragas, a group  of ragas in Hindustani classical music

Cuisine 
 Sarang Burung, edible Javanese bird's nests, and a specialty of Nyai Roro Kidul

See also 
 
 Anak Perawan di Sarang Penjamun, a 1962 Indonesian film
 Sarangi, a bowed, short-necked string instrument from India and Nepal used in Hindustani classical music
 Sareng, a regional name for the Wallago attu catfish
 Sarong, a wrap-around garment